Desert Star may refer to:

 Monoptilon, the desertstar flower;
 Desert Star Theater, a dinner theatre in Murray, Utah, USA;
 Desert Star Weekly, community newspaper from the Mojave Desert, California, USA;
 DESERT STAR, alias for Jay Cosmic on Monstercat.

See also
 Hi-Desert Star, newspaper from San Bernardino County, California, USA
 Star of the Desert Arena, indoor arena in Primm, Nevada, USA
 Desert Sun (disambiguation)
 Desert (disambiguation)
 Star (disambiguation)